Grégorio Juan Esperón (known in different sources as Iván Esperón or Gregorio Esperón) (August 15, 1912 – September 30, 2000) was an Argentine professional football player and coach.

He was a very good right back, probably, the best defensive player in the history of Platense. In 1938, he refused a transfer to a bigger club, because he did not want his team, Platense, to be weakened. As a player, at the end of his career, he played 7 games for A.S. Roma in the Serie A in the 1946/47 season, where he also coached the youth teams.

Between 1940 and 1942, he played 10 games for the Argentina national team, scoring one goal against Uruguay. In 1941, he was part of the national team that won the Copa América (Campeonato Sudamericano). He also coached the Ecuador national team.

After he retired as a player, he coached in Argentina, Ecuador and Paraguay. He coached Platense, his old team, from 1948-1950 and 1956; Barcelona SC in 1950; Emelec from 1951-1953; Ecuador in 1953; Deportiva Valdez in 1953; Cerro Porteño in 1954. His last coaching job was Excursionistas in 1964.

External links
 Murió Gregorio Esperón by La Nación

1912 births
2000 deaths
Footballers from Buenos Aires
Argentine people of Galician descent
Argentine footballers
Argentina international footballers
Club Atlético Platense footballers
Argentine expatriate footballers
Expatriate footballers in Italy
Serie A players
A.S. Roma players
Club Atlético Tigre footballers
Argentine football managers
Club Atlético Platense managers
Barcelona S.C. managers
C.S. Emelec managers
9 de Octubre F.C. managers
Argentine expatriate sportspeople in Italy
Ecuador national football team managers
Association football midfielders
Juan Aurich managers